Hibernia was a passenger ship built at Prince Edward's Island in 1828. She was transporting passengers from Liverpool to Australia when a shipboard fire in the South Atlantic on 5 February 1833 destroyed her.

Background
Hibernia had two decks, with poop and forecastle decks. She had three masts, a square stern, quarter quarter galleries, and a scroll head. She was registered at Bristol on 6 April 1829, with owner John Cambridge. Cambridge mortgaged her, but died. The mortgage holders died also, and the executors of his will and that of the executors of the holders, who were in bankruptcy when they died, sold Hibernia on 8 November 1832 to Edward Walkinshaw, a merchant of Liverpool.

Her first master was John Kemp. He sailed Hibernia between Bristol and Quebec. Then on 24 November 1832 William Brend assumed command at Liverpool.

Loss
Hibernia initially sailed from Liverpool on 27 November, but needed to return for repairs caused by a storm. She left again on 6 December 1832, bound for the Cape of Good Hope, Van Diemen's Land, and Sydney. Her complement consisted of 209 passengers (79 males, 80 females, and 50 children), and 19 seamen and 4 apprentices; total 232.

A fire in the South Atlantic on 5 February 1833 destroyed her. The fire was caused when second mate, Samuel Geddes, accidentally dropped a flame onto rum in the spirit room.

Of the 232 people on board the ship, 62 were rescued on 11 February by the convict ship Lotus, John Summerson, master, and delivered to Rio de Janeiro on 12 February. Nine more took to a pinnace and were rescued by the brig Isabella, Le Fere, master, and also delivered to Rio de Janeiro on 21 February. All the remaining passengers and crew drowned. (Other accounts report 78 survivors.)

List of Survivors:

William Brend, Commander
James Geddes. Second mate
William Grace, attorney
John Brown Favell, M.D.
Peter Sinclair, Esq.
Richard Murray, Esq
Mrs Ridley, widow
Mrs Watson
John Toole, wife and children
John Byrne
George Meayan
Cosmo Webster
Patrick Donnelly
Thomas Heran
George Nashton and two children
Patrick Conolly and wife
James Taylor
Henry Palmer
George Howard
Thomas Elison
James Ebes
Nathaniel Hartley
William Harley
William Bromley
Mrs Thomas Moulter, widow
Mrs Edward Matthews, window
John James, seaman
James McQuade, seaman
Samuel Bean, seaman
Henry Lloyd, seaman
Henry Geeten, seaman
Henry Duggan, seaman
John Mahony, seaman
Charles Leighton, seaman
James Davis, seaman
Isabella Smith
Emily Smith
Elizabeth Bunker
Elizabeth Ging
Anne Colbert
Elizabeth Woods
Mrs Thompson
Mrs Logan (lost two children)
Thomas Graham
James Easy
Thomas Griffin
John Murphy
Peter Dee
James Sly and wife
James Bryson
Timothy Moriarty
Henry Gillis
Henry Richardson
Vincent Broomhall, orphan
William Broomhall, orphan
Henry Taylor, First Mate
Charles Atkinson, Esq.
James Campbell, wife and four children
James Perry
Robert Holmes
William Ray
John Williamson
Robert Cheap
William Meage
James Tennant
George Richardson
Edwin Graham

Notes, citations, and references
Notes

Citations

References
 
 
 
 

http://nla.gov.au/nla.news-article32144121

Shipwrecks in the Atlantic Ocean
1828 ships
Maritime incidents in February 1833
Maritime history of Australia
Victorian-era passenger ships of the United Kingdom